Aberdeen University Students' Association (often referred to as AUSA) is the students' association of the University of Aberdeen, an ancient university in the city of Aberdeen in North East Scotland. It organises recreational activities; provides welfare and employment services for students; promotes equality and diversity of students; advancement of education; and provide facilities and support for student societies and sports clubs.

Services
AUSA has around 14,000 members. AUSA organises its services over a number of sites alongside the co-ordination of fifty-eight sports clubs or ninety nine teams run by the AUSA Sports Union and 150 affiliated student societies run by the AUSA Societies Union. It also runs events such as Freshers' Week, the Graduation ball, the annual Sports Blues Ball, Superteam], the largest university sports event in Scotland and the annual Torcher Parade, the largest student torch-lit parade in Europe.  This parade is just one part of the annual Aberdeen Students' Charities Campaign, now known as RAG (Raising & Giving).  This campaign itself grew out of the Student Show, an annual theatrical and musical enterprise that began in Aberdeen in 1921 with the aim of raising money for charitable causes. The most recent version, Michty Mia, based on the hit Mamma Mia! broke records and helped the campaign raise over £120,000 which was distributed to over 36 local charities.

History
For almost 100 years, representation of students was carried out, in common with the other ancient universities in Scotland, by a students' representative council (SRC). While this remains the official name of the body created by the Universities (Scotland) Act 1889, the Students' Association opted to use the term Students' Association Council to describe it and today goes by Student Council when organising elections and referring to itself to the student body.

This follows significant structural changes to the Students' Association which began in the late 1990s. Previously AUSA stood for Aberdeen University Students' Assembly, and within it there were four bodies with distinct identities and management: the SRC (based at Luthuli House, located next to King's College, and supporting activities including educational support, welfare, political campaigning, and societies); the Students' Union (in the form of a prize-winning social venue at Broad Street in the city centre, including two bars, two night clubs, games facilities, shops, and offices); the Athletics Association (based at the Butchart Recreation Centre, Old Aberdeen); and Debater (the debating society, based with the SRC in Luthuli House). Following the changes at the turn of the millennium which formally created AUSA as we know today, the AA became known as the Sports Union.

The Aberdeen Students' Charities Campaign – which also included the Robert Gordon University, Northern College (subsequently merged into Aberdeen University), and Aberdeen College – which was also based in the SRC building at Luthuli House. Periodically the National Union of Students Scotland North of Scotland Area ("NUSNOS") office was also housed at the SRC building. Since 2013, the Charities Campaign ceased to exist and instead a RAG (Raising and Giving) arm of the organisation was created by the then Charities President, Emily Beever. This was in line with many other Students' Unions and Associations across the UK.

Sites
The AUSA is primarily based at the Students' Union Building located in the Old Aberdeen "campus" area near King's College on Elphinstone Road. The AUSA Sports Union and the Sport Officer, formerly based at Butchart, are now based in the Aberdeen Sports Village and inside the AUSA Building.

Due to financial pressures, AUSA's chief students' union building (located on Broad Street near Marischal College in the city centre) was forced to close in early 2004. The Union Bar, a far smaller, single bar without nightclub facilities, was subsequently opened in nearby Littlejohn Street. This bar was itself forced to close due to financial pressures in November 2008 leaving the University without any Union nightlife facility.

Media
The University's student newspaper, the Gaudie, is affiliated with the AUSA. Published fortnightly during the academic terms, it is recognised as one of the oldest student newspapers in Scotland.

The SRC introduced one of the first ever students' association websites in 1994. It has seen many formats over the years and is also ongoing continual revival and renewal.

Aberdeen Student Radio is also affiliated with AUSA. Having relaunched as a live station in January 2017, the internet-based broadcaster is Aberdeen's first student radio station in ten years. It broadcasts live every day during term time.

Previously, short-term Restricted Service Licenses had been granted to the University's first student radio station, Slick FM, in the mid-1990s; this had enabled broadcasts to be made to the whole city over FM radio, but only for a few weeks each year.

Since 2013, the Granite City TV (GCTV) has functioned offering news, promotional videos for societies and sports clubs, as well as AUSA-led videos.

Executive committee 
The executive positions within AUSA are one-year sabbatical positions for which any student may stand. An annual election takes place before Easter for the following year's committee. There are also a number of non-sabbatical positions, which are again, elected by students on a yearly basis.

Sabbatical Team 
AUSA has 5 sabbatical officer positions. These are elected in March of every year, with the new team taking office at the beginning of July.

Organisational Structures

The Association is student-led and the Sabbatical Officers, elected in the spring term of each year, are the visible drivers of operation and direction. Within the Association there are staff structures which are there to support the operation of the student services it provides. This so-called 'behind the scenes' side of AUSA, includes the running of the Societies' Union, Sports' Union (based at the Aberdeen Sports Village and the AUSA building), AUSA Advice, RAG (Raising & Giving) along with the administrative side of the organisation. Since October 2016, Margaret Paterson has been the CEO.

The Trustee Board of the Organisation is the overall governing body of AUSA, which is a registered charity with OSCR, the Charities regulator in Scotland. 
The Trustee Board is made up of the Sabbatical Officers, External Trustees and Student Trustees.

2015/16 Crisis 
In the Academic Year 2015/16, several crisis points were acknowledged by AUSA with a claim that "AUSA is Broken" sent in an all-student communication highlighting structural issues. Further to this were consequent blog posts on the AUSA website acknowledging the need for a new constitution and a new sabbatical officer structure to come into effect in 2016/17.

Further controversy arose with the breaking news by STV News that the CEO, Jacqueline McKay had been removed from the post along with other allegations.

Despite setbacks, a new constitution was created and installed along with a new sabbatical structure by the incumbent team – Genna Clarke, Veronica Hoffman, Laura Cristea, Megan Burgoyne, Liam Fuller & Holly Bruce. Liam Fuller was the only officer who sought re-election. The first election for the new sabbatical team took place that same year with the new structure taking effect in the academic session of 2016/17. Chubbe Anucha was elected president. The other elected officers were Lewis MacLeod – Communities Officer, Liam Fuller – Education Officer, Alice McClellan – Sports Officer, and Jenny Killin – Welfare Officer.

References

External links 
 Aberdeen University Students' Association
 Aberdeen University Debater
 Aberdeen Student Radio

University of Aberdeen
Students' unions in Scotland